P82 may refer to:

 Boulton Paul P.82 Defiant, a British interceptor aircraft
 , a patrol boat of the Royal Australian Navy
 , a submarine of the Royal Navy
 North American XP-82 Twin Mustang, an American fighter aircraft
 Papyrus 82, a biblical manuscript
 WM P82, a Fench sports prototype racing car
 P82, a state regional road in Latvia